Shadrach Edward Robert Jones ( – 12 July 1895) was a New Zealand doctor, auctioneer, hotel-owner and impresario. He was born in Gravesend, Kent, England in circa 1822.

References

1822 births
1895 deaths
19th-century New Zealand medical doctors
New Zealand hoteliers
People from Gravesend, Kent
English emigrants to New Zealand
New Zealand auctioneers